Blanche Neige is a contemporary ballet production of Snow White by Angelin Preljocaj with the music of Gustav Mahler.

Film version
Preljocaj directed a filmed version of the ballet in 2009.

Film cast

References

External links 
 

2009 films
2009 television films
2000s musical films
French musical films
French television films
German television films
Films based on Snow White
Ballet films
Ballets to the music of Gustav Mahler
2000s French films